Truth is a concept most often used to mean in accord with fact or reality, or fidelity to an original or to a standard or ideal.

Truth may also refer to

Entertainment

Albums
 Truth!, 1970 album by Houston Person
 Truth? (album), 1997 album by Sugizo
 Truth (Guy King album) 2016
 Truth (Jeff Beck album), 1968
 Truth (Robben Ford album), 2007
 Truth (Duke Jordan album), 1983
 T.R.U.T.H. (Guy Sebastian album), 2020
 Truth (Southern Sons album), 1993
 Truth (1998 Michael Sweet album), demo album
 Truth (2000 Michael Sweet album), the full-length version
 Truth (T-Square album), 1987
 Truth (Talisman album), 1998

Songs
 "Truth" (Bloc Party song), from the 2012 album Four
 "Truth" (Chiddy Bang song), from the 2010 album The Swelly Express
 "Truth" (Chingiz song), 2019 song that represented Azerbaijan in the Eurovision Song Contest 2019
 "Truth" (CNBLUE song), from the 2014 album Wave
 "Truth" (Seether song), from the 2004 album Karma and Effect
 "Truth" (Yuna Ito song), from the 2006 album Heart
 "Truth/Kaze no Mukō e", a single Japanese boy band Arashi
 "Truth?", a song by Def Leppard from their 1996 album Slang
 "Truth", a song by Alex Ebert from his 2011 album Alexander
 "Truth", a song by Janet Jackson from her 2001 album All for You
 "Truth", a song by Duke Jordan from his 1983 album Truth
 "Truth", a song by Gwen Stefani from her 2016 album This Is What the Truth Feels Like
 "Truth", a song by Michael Sweet from his 1998 album Truth
 "Truth", a song by Michael Sweet from his 2000 album Truth
 "Truth", a song by T-Square from their 1987 album Truth
 "Truth", a song by Twice from their 2015 album The Story Begins
 "Truth", a song by Zane

Film
 Truth (2013 film), an American psychological thriller film
 Truth (2015 film), an American political docudrama film starring Cate Blanchett and Robert Redford
 Truth: Live in St. Petersburg, live DVD by t.A.T.u.

Television
 "Truths" (Dark), fifth episode of Dark (TV series) (2017)
 "Truth" (The Falcon and the Winter Soldier), fifth episode of the 2021 TV series

Other uses in entertainment
 Truth (American band), Christian music group
 Truth (musical duo), a dubstep production duo from Christchurch, New Zealand
 Truth (British periodical), published 1877–1957
 Truth (comics), Truth: Red, White & Black a seven-issue comic book limited series
 Truth (magazine), American magazine, published 1881–1905
 Truth (novel), 2009 novel by Peter Temple
 "Truth", a lyric poem by Geoffrey Chaucer

Newspapers

Australia
 Truth, several Australian tabloid newspapers, associated in varying degrees with John Norton (journalist):
 Truth (Adelaide newspaper)
 Truth (Brisbane newspaper)
 Truth (Melbourne newspaper)
 Truth (Perth newspaper)
 Truth (Sydney newspaper)
 Barrier Daily Truth, in Broken Hill, Australia

Elsewhere             
 Truth (British periodical), a British periodical noted for its investigative journalism.
 The Elkhart Truth, a daily newspaper in Elkhart, Indiana, US
 New Zealand Truth, in Auckland, New Zealand
 Adevărul (The Truth), a Romanian daily newspaper in Bucharest
 Pravda (Truth), a Russian broadsheet newspaper
 Tiesa, a defunct Lithuanian newspaper whose title translates "Truth"

Religion
 Truth (Buddhism)
 Truth (religious)
 Two by Twos, a home-based church movement referred to by its membership as Truth or The Truth
 Truth Magazine (religious magazine), published by the Guardian of Truth Foundation

Other
 Truth (anti-tobacco campaign), advertising campaign
 Truth (Bernini), a 1645 sculpture by Bernini
 Truth (quantum number), value in quantum system of elementary particles
 Truth value, value indicating the relation of a proposition to objective truth
 Objective truth, philosophical concept
 Prophet of Truth, character in video game series Halo
 Sojourner Truth (1797–1883), abolitionist and women's rights activist
 Truthout, advocacy organization
 Truth Social, announced social media platform by Trump Media & Technology Group (TMTG)

See also
 Pravda (disambiguation)
 The Truth (disambiguation)
 True (disambiguation)
 Veracity (disambiguation)
 Veritas (disambiguation)
 What is truth (disambiguation)
 
 

cs:Pravda (rozcestník)